The Khachna Range (Jibal Khashna; Berber Adrar n Kheshna) is a mountain range of the Tell Atlas, part of the Atlas Mountain System. It is located in Kabylie, Algeria.

Geography

The Khachna is a massif made up of two differentiated ranges, one in the north between Thénia and Zemmouri, and the other in the south between Thénia and Lakhdaria.

Other notable summits are the 710 m high Djerrah Mount, a peak located in the central area of the massif, a second highest point of the southern subrange.

Villages
This mountain range is home to dozens of villages including:

Summits

Several mountain peaks are found in this mountain range:
  (1032 m)
 Djerrah Mount (740 m)
 Ighil Zenabir Mount (630 m)
 Ben Norah Mount (467 m)
 Sidi Fredj Mount (452 m)
 Bouarous Mount (444 m)
 Soumâa Mount (430 m)

Forests

The plant cover in this mountain range shelters several forests including:
 Boukram Forest
 Corso Forest
 Zbarbar Forest
 Zemmouri Forest

Rivers

This mountain range is crossed by dozens of rivers:
 Arbia River
 
 
 
 Hamiz River
 Isser River
 Keddache River
 Meraldene River

Dams

Several hydraulic dams have been built on the waterways of this mountain range:
 Keddara Dam
 Meraldene Dam

Gallery

See also
Kabyles
List of mountains in Algeria
Tell Atlas

References

Mountain ranges of the Atlas Mountains
Mountain ranges of Algeria
Biosphere reserves of Algeria
Geography of Algeria
Geology of Algeria
Boumerdès Province